Alfred Thomas may refer to:

 Alfred Thomas, 1st Baron Pontypridd
 Alfred Delavan Thomas (1837-1896), US federal judge
 Alfred Brumwell Thomas (1868-1948), English architect
 Alfred Thomas (boxer) (born 1949), Guyanese boxer
 Alfred Thomas (footballer) (born 1895), English footballer

See also